Carys Bray is a British writer whose 2014 debut novel, A Song for Issy Bradley, was critically acclaimed. Bray is a lapsed Mormon, and A Song for Issy Bradley is about a Mormon family who undergo a crisis of faith.

Her second novel, The Museum of You, was published in 2016.

According to The Bookseller she earned a "strong five figure" advance, in 2019, for an upcoming novel about climate change, entitled When the Lights Go Out.

Bray uses a treadmill desk, when writing.

Awards and honours
 2015, Authors’ Club Best First Novel Award
 2011, Scott Prize
 2010, Edge Hill Prize

References

Living people
21st-century British novelists
British women novelists
Year of birth missing (living people)
Place of birth missing (living people)